McCallum may refer to:

Places
 McCallum, Newfoundland and Labrador, Canada
 McCallum Pass, a pass between the northeast ridge of Mount Mangin and the ridge on the south side of Stonehouse Bay, in the southern part of Adelaide Island, Antarctica
 McCallum Settlement, Nova Scotia, Canada
 McCallum Street, Chinatown, Singapore

Buildings
 McCallum Adobe Museum, Palm Springs, California
 McCallum High School, public high school in Austin, Texas
 McCallum Manor, historic apartment building located in the Mount Airy neighborhood of Philadelphia, Pennsylvania
 McCallum Theatre, theatre and concert venue on the campus of College of the Desert in Palm Desert, California

People
 McCallum (surname), for list of people whose surname is McCallum

Film and television
McCallum (TV series), Scottish TV series broadcast from 1995 to 1998

Others
 McCallum Brothers, Auckland, New Zealand-based sand and construction aggregate supplier
 McCallum rule, monetary policy, specifying a target for the monetary base (M0) which could be used by a central bank

See also
Macallum, a surname
McCollum (disambiguation)